The 2001 NBDL Draft was the inaugural draft of the National Basketball Development League (NBDL), which was later renamed the NBA Development League (NBADL). The draft was held on November 1, 2001 before the 2001–02 season. In this draft, the league's eight charter teams took turns selecting players who had all competed at the college level in the United States at some point.

Chris Andersen of Blinn Community College (Brenham, Texas) was the first overall selection and was taken by Fayetteville Patriots. Consequently, this makes him the first-ever selection in the history of the NBADL. The first non-American selected was Gabe Muoneke, a Nigerian who was the fourth overall pick by the Columbus Riverdragons. Eight nations in all were represented in the 2001 NBDL Draft, with the most being the United States (87) followed by Senegal (3). No players selected in this draft have ever been named an NBA D-League All-Star, largely because the annual contest did not come into existence until the 2006–07 season. Two league award winners were taken in this draft, however: Fred House of the North Charleston Lowgators (46th overall) was named the 2001–02 NBDL Rookie of the Year, while Jeff Myers of the Greenville Groove (67th overall) was tabbed the Defensive Player of the Year. Four players were also NBA Draft selections: DeeAndre Hulett, Mark Karcher and Jaquay Walls were all picked in the 2000 NBA Draft, while Kris Bruton was picked in 1994.

Although some of the players chosen in the 2001 NBDL Draft had played semi-professional and/or professional basketball after college graduation, only the United States colleges they attended are listed.

Key

Draft

All information summarised in this table comes from the NBA draft announcement except the nationalities.

References
General

Specific

Draft
NBA G League draft
National Basketball Development League draft
National Basketball Development League draft
Basketball in Georgia (U.S. state)
Events in Georgia (U.S. state)
Sports in the Atlanta metropolitan area
Suwanee, Georgia